Sandrine is a popular French female name. It is a diminutive form of Sandra, a shortened form of Alexandra, the female version of Alexander, which means Protector of Men. There are variants such as Sandrilene.

People
 Sandrine (singer), Australian singer-songwriter of pop music
 Sandrine Bailly, French biathlete
 Sandrine Blancke, Belgian actress
 Sandrine Bonnaire, French actress
 Sandrine Corman, Belgian model
 Sandrine Doucet, French politician
 Sandrine Dudoit, French-American statistician
 Sandrine François, French singer
 Sandrine Fricot, French high jumper
 Sandrine Holt, Canadian actress
 Sandrine Kiberlain, French actress
 Sandrina Malakiano, Indonesian journalist
 Sandrine Piau, French opera singer
 Sandrine Pinna, Taiwanese actress
 Sandrine Renard, Canadian journalist
 Sandrine Tas, Belgian inline speed skater and long track speed skater
 Sandrine Testud, French tennis player
 Sandrine Veysset, French film director

Fictional characters
 Sandrilene fa Toren, character from Tamora Pierce's quartets.

See also
Sandra (given name)
Sandro (disambiguation)
Sandy (disambiguation)

French feminine given names